Vanguard College Preparatory School, founded in 1973, is a private, independent, coeducational, college preparatory day school located in Waco, Texas, United States, for students in grades 7-12.  Enrollment, as of the 2022-2023 academic year is 268, with 41 on the teaching faculty.  

Vanguard is a college style campus. A science and math building was completed in 1984, two gymnasiums were completed in 1980 and enlarged as a multi-purpose facility in 1992, and a performing arts center was completed in 1987. A new classroom building opened for use in the fall of 2000 and a new visual arts building and video studio opened in 2004. Administrative offices were renovated in 2005 and the gymnasium complex was renovated in 2006. State of the art computer labs are accessible to students, and the entire campus has Wi-Fi. Art, drama, music, publications, service organizations, debate, Knowledge Master, Mock Trial and athletics are among their extracurricular options. The 2014 and 2016 editions of Liquid Paper, Vanguard's literary magazine, received a superior rating from the National Council of Teachers of English. The 2011 edition, Circadian, received first place from the American Scholastic Press Association.

Athletics
Vanguard has won over forty-four team state titles.

Students can play multiple sports.

The Varsity Golf team won 12 consecutive state championships from 2005-2016
Vanguard's biggest rivals include cross-town rivals Live Oak Classical, Texas Christian Academy, and Reicher Catholic.
Varsity Teams - Football, Basketball, Baseball, Softball, Soccer, Golf, Volleyball, Tennis, Track, Cross Country, Cheerleading.  Vanguard is 4A in TAPPS.

Vanguard has fostered Division 1 Athletes in Basketball, Golf, Volleyball, Tennis, and Softball.

National Merit Commended Scholars and Semifinalist
Vanguard has had over 41 National Merit Finalist in the past 17 years

Accreditation
Southern Association of Colleges and Schools, and approved by the Texas Education Agency.

Memberships
 National Association of Independent Schools
 Southern Association of Independent Schools
 Texas Association of Private and Parochial Schools
 Texas Association of Non-Public Schools
 The College Board
 National Association of Secondary School Principals
 National Association of College Admission Counseling
 Texas Association of College Admission Counseling
 Texas Association of Supervision and Curriculum Development
 Texas Counseling Association

Notable alumni
 Country musician Pat Green

References

High schools in Waco, Texas
High schools in Central Texas
Private high schools in Texas
Private middle schools in Texas
Preparatory schools in Texas